The 1962 Australian Tourist Trophy was a motor race staged at the Mallala circuit in South Australia on 28 December 1962. It was the sixth annual Australian Tourist Trophy race, and was recognized by the Confederation of Australian Motor Sport as the Australian championship for sports cars.

The race was won by Bib Stillwell driving a Cooper Monaco.

Results

Note:
 McKay finished the race in second place, but was subsequently disqualified from the results for receiving outside assistance to restart his car after a spin during the race.

Race statistics
 Number of starters: 18
 Number of finishers: 13
 Race distance: 40 laps – 84 miles
 Weather: Drizzling rain
 Start: Le Mans type
 Fastest lap: D. McKay, 1:56.9 (New lap record, Sports - Up to 1100cc)

References

Australian Tourist Trophy
Tourist Trophy